Matsuken Samba II (マツケンサンバII) is one of a song series named Matsuken Samba performed by a Japanese taiga drama actor and singer Ken Matsudaira who is popular in Japan.

Overview 

The song was made in 1994 and is performed in theaters since then. He sings the song in an appearance of a person in Edo period with florid golden kimono, dancing with steps of samba and hip swaying, and with many male and female backup dancers around also in figures of the period.

Because he plays a serious shōgun as an actor on television in the first place and had been performing the song only in theaters, the performance amazed people who did not know it upon being introduced on television in 2004.

The song became the biggest hit in the Matsuken Samba series. All the songs in the series combine traditional-style Japanese vocals with a slight Latino flair from Brazilian samba music and the inclusion of several Brazilian Portuguese words and phrases in the lyrics, although Matsuken Samba II has a word "bongo" which is a musical instrument not used in samba. The performances of the songs have a very glitzy, showy production value trademarked by his glittery appearance.

The Matsuken in the title is a shortened version of the singer's name, a combination of Matsu from Matsudaira and his stage name Ken.

History 

The first single of the line was this Matsuken Samba II, released on July 7, 2004. The song was officially a sequel to Matsuken Samba I that he had been performing at the close of his concerts prior to 2004, which was not released on CDs until it was added as one of the b-sides to Matsuken Samba II.

Upon release, the song was a modest hit, mostly among Matsudaira's fanbase of primarily middle-aged women. But a gradual increase in media coverage and an affectionate parody of the song and dance by Katsuken on the popular idol group SMAP's television show SMAP×SMAP made the song a certified hit. The single remained on the Oricon Top 100 chart for over a year, and spawned two additional single releases: Matsuken Samba II: Ole! EP, a CD of remixes of the original single, and Matsuken Samba III, a follow-up single that borrowed liberally from its predecessor. The latest in the series, released in 2014, is "Matsuken Samba 4 - Jounetsu no Salsa (マツケンサンバ4~情熱のサルサ~)", and as the title implies, it is more so a Salsa than a Samba.

External links
 Ken Matsudaira / Matsuken Samba II - Official Website (in Japanese).

2004 songs
Japanese songs